is a railway station in Yufu, Ōita Prefecture, Japan. It is operated by JR Kyushu and is on the Kyudai Main Line.

Lines

Layout 
The station consists of two side platforms serving two tracks at grade. The station building, a modern steel structure, is unstaffed and serves only to house a waiting area and an automatic ticket vending machine. From the access road, it is necessary to go up a short flight of steps to enter the station building. Access to the opposite side platform is by means of a footbridge.

Adjacent stations

History
On 1 December 1922, the Daito Railway was nationalized and absorbed into Japanese Government Railways, (JGR) which designated the track which served the station as part of the Daito Line. On 15 November 1934, when the Daito Line had linked up with the Kyudai Main Line further west, JGR designated the station as part of the Kyudai Main Line. With the privatization of Japanese National Railways (JNR), the successor of JGR, on 1 April 1987, the station came under the control of JR Kyushu.

The station, which formerly had an outsourced ticket window, became unstaffed from April 2016.

Passenger statistics
In fiscal 2016, the station was used by an average of 357 passengers daily (boarding passengers only), and it ranked 284th among the busiest stations of JR Kyushu.

See also
List of railway stations in Japan

References

External links
Onoya (JR Kyushu)

Railway stations in Ōita Prefecture
Railway stations in Japan opened in 1915